Haşim is the Turkish spelling of the Arabic masculine given name Hashim. People with the name include:

 Haşim İşcan (1898–1968), Turkish politician
 Haşim Kılıç (born 1950), Turkish judge
 Ahmet Haşim (1884–1933), Turkish poet

Other
Hasim, Saudi Arabia

Surnames of Arabic origin
Turkish masculine given names